In Japan some railway stations were built in response to a petition of the local governments or companies near the new station etc., and the railway company did not bear all construction costs. These are called   in Japanese. This article lists some of these stations.

The first station opened by petition on a JR line was Higashi-Koganei Station on the Chūō Main Line, which was opened in 1964 before privatization of the Japanese National Railways (JNR). This station is located close to a commemoration hall.

Shinkansen stations
Sorted by opening year
 1
 
 
 
 1
 
 
 
 
 2
 
1 A station already existed on the Tōkaidō Main Line.
2 A station already existed on the Sanyō Main Line.

JR lines other than Shinkansen 
Stations opened after privatization of JNR

 
 
  (明峰駅)
 
 
 
 
  (中野東駅)
 
 
 
 
  (呉ポートピア駅)
 
  (広川ビーチ駅)
 
 
 
  (安芸長浜駅)
 
 
  (東尾道駅)
 
 
  (かるが浜駅)
  (水尻駅)
  (前空駅)
 
 
 
  (北長瀬駅)
 
 
  (三河塩津駅)
  (豊田町駅)
 
 
  (古淵駅)
  (青山駅)
  (玉戸駅)
  (大和駅)
 
 
 
 
 
  (さつき野駅)
  (小野上温泉駅)
 
 
  (八王子みなみ野駅)
 
 
 
  (紫波中央駅)
  (東松戸駅)
  (前橋大島駅)
 
 
 
  (ウェスパ椿山駅)
 
  (高崎問屋町駅)
  (内野西が丘駅)
 
 
 
 
 
  (野田新町駅)
  (和木駅)
 
 
 Izumi-Sotoasahikawa（泉外旭川駅）

Railways other than JR 
 (板倉東洋大前駅, Tōbu Nikkō Line)
 (船橋日大前駅, Toyo Rapid Railway Line)
 (荒川一中前駅, Toden Arakawa Line)
 (Tokyo Waterfront Area Rapid Transit Rinkai Line)
 (Odakyū Tama Line)
 (日華化学前駅, Echizen Railway Mikuni Awara Line)
 (八ツ島駅, Echizen Railway Mikuni Awara Line)
 (Ohmi Railway Main Line)
 (大阪教育大前駅, Kintetsu Osaka Line)
 (和歌山大学前駅, Nankai Main Line)
 (たのうら御立岬公園駅, Hisatsu Orange Railway)